Rowland v. Christian,  (1968), was a case decided by the Supreme Court of California. It eliminated the categories of invitee, licensee, and trespasser to determine the duty of care owed by a possessor of land to the people on the land. It replaced the classifications with a general duty of care.

Background
The plaintiff, James Davis Rowland, Jr., was a guest in the apartment of the defendant, Nancy Christian. The plaintiff requested to use the bathroom and a water faucet handle broke off in his hand, leaving him with severed tendons and nerve damage.

The defendant had complained to the landlord about the broken handle but did not warn the plaintiff. The trial judge granted summary judgment on behalf of the defendant, and the plaintiff appealed.

Decision

Majority opinion
Justice Raymond E. Peters wrote the majority opinion, which explained that common law distinctions between an invitee, licensee, and trespasser traditionally determined the duty of care owed by a possessor of land to a plaintiff. A duty of care to warn about the dangerous condition of an area is owed to invitees and licensees under the distinctions but not to trespassers.

The majority considered the classifications to be an unhelpful shortcut to determine negligence, and that a general duty of care should be owed to all visitors to land. The summary judgment for the defendant was reversed because the defendant should have warned the plaintiff of the broken handle.

The most heavily quoted passage from Rowland is as follows:

As of 2000, Rowland had inspired appellate courts in at least nine other U.S. states and the District of Columbia to completely abandon the traditional distinctions between invitees, licensees, and trespassers, while 14 other U.S. states were persuaded by Rowland to modify and simplify those distinctions.

Dissenting opinion
Justice Louis H. Burke wrote a dissenting opinion in which fellow conservative Justice Marshall F. McComb concurred. Burke argued that the majority had unnecessarily thrown away centuries of clear precedent for a future of "potentially unlimited liability."  He felt that such a dramatic change in the law should come from the legislature.

References

External links
 

United States tort case law
1968 in United States case law
California state case law
1968 in California